Kepler-1708b I is an exomoon candidate that may orbit around the exoplanet Kepler-1708b, which is located about 5500 light-years from the Solar System.

Notations such as Kepler 1708b-i can also be seen. Kepler-1708b I is the second exomoon candidate, after Kepler-1625b I.

Discovery 

A survey of 70 cooler giant planets potentially hosting exomoons, discovered by the Kepler space telescope through observation of transits, was conducted; only Kepler-1708b was named as a candidate for having satellites. A paper reporting the possible discovery of Kepler-1708b I was submitted to arXiv on January 12, 2022. The false positive rate for Kepler-1708b I is only about 1%, with an even lower probability that the alleged satellite signal may be due to an unknown exoplanet other than Kepler-1708b orbiting around Kepler-1708. Although there is no evidence that Kepler-1708b I is not an exomoon at this time, it is still in the candidate stage, and future follow-up observations are required to confirm its existence. Additional Kepler-1708b I transit observations and transit-timing variations may be observable if future observations are made by the Hubble Space Telescope, James Webb Space Telescope, PLATO, etc. The next transit is expected to occur on March 24, 2023.

Characteristics 

Kepler-1708b I is said to be a mini-Neptune or possibly a super-Earth with a radius of about 2.6 Earth radii. This is a much smaller size than Kepler-1625b I. Kepler-1708b I orbits at a distance of 740,000 kilometres from Kepler 1708b, with a period of about 4.6 days, in the same plane as the planet's orbit around the star.

See also 

 Exomoon                                                             
 Natural satellite
 Kepler-1625b I
 V1400 Centauri

References 

Exomoons